Paris Square can mean:

 Paris Square (Haifa), a city square in Haifa
 Paris Square (Jerusalem), a city square in Jerusalem